The 2001 Durham mayoral election was held on November 5, 2001 to elect the mayor of Durham, North Carolina. It saw the election of Bill Bell, who unseated incumbent mayor Nick Tennyson.

Results

Primary 
The date of the primary was October 9, 2001.

General election

References 

Durham
Mayoral elections in Durham, North Carolina
Durham